is a Japanese voice actress and singer from Nagano Prefecture.  She is affiliated with Across Entertainment.

Furihata made her debut as solo singer in Fall 2020 with her first mini album, "Moonrise" as the first artist affiliated with a new music label under Bandai Namco Arts and Blue Sofa, Purple One Star.

Biography
Furihata was born on February 19 in the Nagano Prefecture and her height is 148 cm. Furihata's hobbies are listening to music and collecting T-shirts. Some of Furihata's achievements include Word Processor Practical Certification Grade 2 and Calligraphy Skill Certification Grade 3.

In 2015, Furihata made her debut as a voice actress with Love Live! Sunshine!! as Ruby Kurosawa. While under Aqours, Furihata also grouped into its sub-unit CYaRon! along with Anju Inami (voice of Chika Takami) and Shuka Saitō (voice of You Watanabe).  Furihata is nicknamed Furirin and Aiai by both Aqours members and fans.

Works

Voice acting roles

Anime
Love Live! Sunshine!! as Ruby Kurosawa
Orange as Saku (eps 13)
Healin' Good PreCure as Element Spirit Water
Rail Romanesque as Iyo
 Dragon Quest: The Adventure of Dai as Gome-chan
I'm Standing on a Million Lives as Majiha Pink
Genjitsu no Yohane: Sunshine in the Mirror as Ruby Kurosawa

Video games
The Alchemist Code as Lisbeth Van Rustburg
Knights of Girls as Saturn; Comet; Sanadi
KRITIKA as Zenith; Jennifer
Love Live! School Idol Festival as Ruby Kurosawa
Quiz RPG: Mahōtsukai to Kuroneko no Wiz as Kaede
Shironeko Project as Alexander; Chitcho; Gries
Icey as ICEY
Project Sekai: Colorful Stage! feat. Hatsune Miku as Airi Momoi
Ash Arms as ZSU-37

Dubbing
Drift as Tina
More than Blue as Bonnie (Emma Wu)

Internet Program
Love Live! Sunshine!! Aqours Niconama Kagai Katsudō ~Trio da yo! Ichi, Ni no Sunshine!!~ (Niconico, since February 5, 2016)

Others
Voice Academia (April 7, 2013 - March 30, 2014, BS Fuji) as assistant MC
Tottemo Yasashii Amae-Chanas Amae-Chan

Discography

Mini albums 
 Moonrise
  (2020)
 Memories of Romance in Summer (2022)
 Memories of Romance in Driving (2022)

Singles 
  (2020)
 "Axiom" (2021)
  (2021)
  (2021)

Videos 
 Ai Furihata 1st Live Tour Apollo at Zepp Diver City (Tokyo) (2021)

References

External links 

Official website 
Official agency profile 

Living people
Voice actresses from Nagano Prefecture
Japanese video game actresses
Japanese voice actresses
1994 births
Anime singers
21st-century Japanese actresses
21st-century Japanese singers
21st-century Japanese women singers
Aqours members
Across Entertainment voice actors